This is a list of butterflies of Egypt. About 63 species are known from Egypt, two of which are endemic.

Papilionidae
Papilio saharae

Pieridae
Belenois aurota
Calopieris eulimene 
Catopsilia florella
Colias croceus
Colotis chrysonome
Colotis danae
Colotis fausta
Colotis liagore
Colotis phisadia
Colotis protomedia
Elphinstonia charlonia
Euchloe aegyptiaca
Euchloe belemia
Euchloe falloui
Pieris brassicae
Pieris rapae
Pontia daplidice
Pontia glauconome
Zegris eupheme

Lycaenidae
Anthene amarah
Azanus jesous
Azanus ubaldus
Chilades eleusis
Cigaritis acamas
Cigaritis myrmecophila
Deudorix livia
Freyeria trochylus
Iolana alfierii
Kretania philbyi
Lampides boeticus
Leptotes pirithous
Luthrodes pandava
Lycaena phlaeas
Lycaena thersamon
Plebejidea loewii
Polyommatus icarus
Pseudophilotes abencerragus
Pseudophilotes sinaicus
Satyrium jebelia
Tarucus balkanicus
Tarucus rosaceus
Tomares ballus
Zizeeria karsandra
Zizina otis

Nymphalidae
Charaxes hansali
Chazara persephone
Danaus chrysippus
Hypolimnas misippus
Junonia hierta
Melitaea deserticola
Melitaea trivia
Pseudotergumia pisidice
Vanessa atalanta
Vanessa cardui

Hesperiidae
Borbo borbonica
Carcharodus alceae
Carcharodus stauderi ambigua
Carcharodus stauderi ramses
Gegenes nostrodamus
Gomalia elma
Pelopidas thrax
Sarangesa phidyle
Spialia doris doris
Spialia doris amenophis

References

Egypt
Egypt
Butterflies